Shaw is an unincorporated community in Saint Louis County, Minnesota, United States; located on Saint Louis County Road 15 (Munger Shaw Road), near Saint Louis County Road 49 (Three Lakes Road).

The community is located in the southeast corner of Cotton Township, near the boundary line; and is within the Cloquet Valley State Forest of Saint Louis County.

Bug Creek flows through the community.

References

 Rand McNally Road Atlas – 2007 edition – Minnesota entry
 Official State of Minnesota Highway Map – 2011/2012 edition

Unincorporated communities in Minnesota
Unincorporated communities in St. Louis County, Minnesota